Marvin Daniel Levy (born August 3, 1925) is an American former football coach and executive who was a head coach in the National Football League (NFL) for seventeen seasons. He spent most of his head coaching career with the Buffalo Bills, leading them from 1986 to 1997. Levy's first head coaching position was with the Montreal Alouettes of Canadian Football League (CFL) from 1973 to 1977, where he won two Grey Cup titles.

After five seasons coaching the Kansas City Chiefs, Levy helped the Bills become one of the most dominant American Football Conference (AFC) teams during the 1990s. His greatest success occurred between 1990 and 1993 when he led Buffalo to a record four consecutive Super Bowls, although each game ended in defeat. Levy concluded his head coaching career with 11 playoff victories and four Super Bowl appearances, both of which are the most of head coaches to not win an NFL championship. After retiring from coaching in 1997, Levy served as the general manager of the Bills from 2006 to 2007. He was inducted to the Pro Football Hall of Fame in 2001 and the Canadian Football Hall of Fame in 2021.

Early life 
Levy was born to a Jewish family in Chicago on August 3, 1925. In 1943, the day after graduation from South Shore High School in Chicago, Levy enlisted in the United States Army Air Forces. He served as a meteorologist at Apalachicola Army Airfield in Florida, but the war ended before his unit deployed to the Pacific.

Though he was known to use historical examples to inspire his teams, Levy corrected those who used war and combat metaphors to describe football games by telling them that he actually fought in a war and that football and war were in no way comparable. Referring to the Super Bowl, he said "This is not a must-win; World War II was a must-win". Steve Tasker, who played for Levy on the Bills, said

In later years, Levy became a supporter of the World War II Memorial and pushed for World War II veterans to be honored at Super Bowl LIV to commemorate the 75th anniversary of the Allied victory in the war, noting that fewer than 3% of those who served in the war were still alive in 2020.

College years
Levy was initially recruited to the Wyoming Cowboys football team as a defensive back. After the coach who recruited Levy left Wyoming, and Levy was displeased and exhausted by the following coach's round-the-clock training regimen, Levy transferred to Coe College in Iowa following a single semester. There he earned varsity letters in football, track, and basketball. He obtained a degree in English literature, was granted membership in the Phi Beta Kappa Society, and was twice voted student council president. He was also a member of the Tau Kappa Epsilon fraternity. He was admitted to Harvard University for graduate studies in 1951, earning a master's degree in English history.

College coaching
Levy's first coaching job was at St. Louis Country Day School, coaching football and basketball, the latter of which he coached to a championship.  Two years later, Levy returned to Coe College as an assistant football coach (1953–1954) and in his second stint as a head coach, he also won a championship—this time in basketball with future NBA Coach Bill Fitch as one of his players.  In 1954, he joined the coaching staff at the University of New Mexico and was named head coach in 1958.  In two seasons as head coach, he guided the Lobos to a 14–6 record and earned Skyline Conference Coach of the Year honors in 1958. He interviewed with the University of California, Berkeley on February 2, 1960, and was announced as the new head coach of the Cal Bears on February 5, 1960. Despite selecting a young Bill Walsh as a coaching assistant, Levy's best record during his four-season tenure as head coach at Cal from 1960 to 1963 was 4–5–1.  He finished his college coaching career with a five-year stint as head coach at the College of William & Mary where he twice earned Southern Conference Coach of the Year honors. In 1965 his team had the school's first winning record in 12 years.

Professional football 
Levy began his professional football coaching career in 1969 as kicking teams coach for the Philadelphia Eagles before joining George Allen's staff as a special teams coach for the Los Angeles Rams in 1970. He followed Allen to Washington, D.C. in 1971, where he served as the Washington Redskins' special teams coach for two seasons. Levy then served as the head coach of the Montreal Alouettes of the Canadian Football League for five seasons. He coached Montreal to three CFL Grey Cup appearances and two championships, and won the Annis Stukus Trophy (Coach of the Year) in 1974. Levy returned to the NFL in 1978 as head coach of the Kansas City Chiefs. He coached the Chiefs for five seasons with steady improvement each year, but was fired at the end of the strike-shortened 1982 season with a 3–6 record.

Midway through the 1986 season, following a two-year hiatus from coaching and one season as the head coach of the Chicago Blitz of the USFL, Levy returned to the NFL with the Buffalo Bills. Initially hired as a television analyst, Levy replaced Hank Bullough seven games into the regular season as head coach. He finished the season with a 2–5 record.  In 1987, his first full season with the Bills, the team returned to respectability with a 7–8 record and were in the playoff hunt throughout most of the season.  The following season the team posted a 12–4 record and won the first of six AFC Eastern Division titles. With his high-powered "no-huddle" offense, Levy's Bills went on to lead his AFC championship team to four consecutive Super Bowl appearances, the most in league history. Each game ended in defeat, however, tying Levy with Bud Grant and Dan Reeves for the most Super Bowl appearances without a victory.

From 1988 through 1997, the Bills were first in the AFC in winning percentage and second only to the San Francisco 49ers in the NFL. Levy, the winningest coach in Bills' history, recorded a 112–70 regular season record and was 11–8 in the playoffs during his eleven seasons with the Bills. He was named NFL Coach of the Year in 1988 and AFC Coach of the Year in 1988, 1993, and 1995.

Coaching tree
Levy's coaching tree is among the largest of any NFL head coach; however, this is largely due to the fact that he once had Bill Walsh as an assistant and most of Walsh's assistants never worked under Levy. Among notable non-Walsh coaches are Wade Phillips, who succeeded Levy as the Bills' head coach and also served as head coach of the Denver Broncos and Dallas Cowboys (along with interim coaching stints for the New Orleans Saints, Atlanta Falcons, and Houston Texans), as well as former Baltimore Ravens and Baltimore/Indianapolis Colts coach Ted Marchibroda, and former New York Sentinels head coach Ted Cottrell. Wally Buono played under Levy in Montreal and went on to become one of the CFL's most successful coaches.

Outspoken pundit Chuck Dickerson worked under Levy for several years in Buffalo before being fired.

First retirement
Levy retired in 1997 and became an analyst for NFL.com. In 2001 Levy was elected to the Pro Football Hall of Fame in Canton, Ohio. Along with former Bills' special-teamer Steve Tasker, Levy did local broadcasts for the Bills' pre-season games from 1998 until being appointed the Bills' general manager in 2006. During the regular season he was a part of the Chicago Bears pregame show on ESPN Radio 1000 (WMVP-AM), as well as a Bears postgame show on Comcast SportsNet.

General manager
On January 5, 2006, Bills owner Ralph Wilson enlisted Levy, at the age of 80, to act as general manager and vice president of football operations for the Buffalo Bills. Following the resignation of Mike Mularkey, there was initial speculation (created by Levy's own comments at a team press conference) that Levy would resume a coaching role with the team. To eliminate this speculation, and to minimize any future tension between Levy and the Bills' new head coach, team owner Wilson said: "He was hired to be the GM and would never coach the team."

Levy's first order of business was to hire a new coach as a replacement for Mularkey, who resigned within days of Levy's appointment. After a strenuous interview process Levy and team owner Wilson hired Detroit Lions interim head coach Dick Jauron as coach. Jauron had been head coach of the Chicago Bears.

Second retirement
Following the Bills' last game of the 2007 season, Levy decided to step down as GM of the Bills (his two-year contract had expired). He has returned to live in his native Chicago, although he also spent some time in Montreal mentoring then-Alouettes head coach Marc Trestman. Levy stated he would be open to returning to coaching if asked. He has also admittedly not paid much attention to professional football in the past several years as of 2017.

In 2009, Levy collaborated with Buffalo football historian Jeffrey J. Miller to write a book entitled Game Changers: The Greatest Plays in Buffalo Bills Football History. In August 2011, Levy published a second book, Between the Lies, featuring a team based loosely on the Bills (including a quarterback named "Kelly James") progressing to the Super Bowl against a Los Angeles-based team and its take-no-prisoners head coach, while a scandal erupts, placing the integrity of the game at risk.

A lifelong Chicago Cubs fan, Levy was among a select few people in attendance at both the 1945 World Series (which he attended while on furlough from the Army Air Forces) and the 2016 World Series. Levy's fourth book, the children's book Go Cubs Go, is about the 2016 series.

In 2020, Levy assisted The Friends of the National World War II Memorial to convince NFL teams — and the league itself — to recognize the 75th anniversary of the war, honoring veterans at Super Bowl LIV in Miami.

In 2021, he was inducted into the Canadian Football Hall of Fame.

Levy made an in-person appearance at the Bills' 2022 home opener, participating in the pregame crowd warm-up alongside his former quarterback, Jim Kelly.

Personal life
Levy and his wife Mary have a daughter, Kim, and two grandchildren Angela (oldest) and Gregory (youngest). Following the death of Art McNally on January 1, 2023, Levy became the oldest living Pro Football Hall of Famer.

Levy is a vegetarian.

Head coaching record

College

Professional

Career highlights
 Won two of three CFL championships in five seasons while head coach of the Montreal Alouettes
 Guided the Bills to six division championships (including four consecutive from 1988 to 1991)
 Compiled a 17–6 record (14–6 in the regular season and 3–0 in the post-season) against the winningest coach in NFL history, Don Shula. He is one of only two coaches to have a winning record against Shula, the other being Tom Flores of the Raiders, who went 6–1 against him.
 Compiled 209 CFL-NFL-USFL coaching victories (T12th in Pro Football History)
 One of only 15 coaches to win 100 games with one NFL team
 The only coach to compete in four Super Bowls in a row
 Retired at the age of 72; tied with George Halas as the oldest non-interim head coach in NFL history.
 First USFL alumnus to be inducted into the Pro Football Hall of Fame
 One of only two coaches to appear in both a Grey Cup Championship Game and the Super Bowl.  The other is Bud Grant.
 Oldest coach ever to win 12 games (age 68) and 10 games (age 71) 
 One of only three people to be enshrined in both the Pro Football Hall of Fame (NFL), and the Canadian Football Hall of Fame.

Books 
 Marv Levy: Where Else Would You Rather Be?, Sports Publishing, 2004. .
 Game Changers: The Greatest Plays in Buffalo Bills History (with Jeffrey Miller), Triumph Books, 2009. .
 Between the Lies (fiction), Ascend Books, 2011. .
 Go Cubs Go! Baseball's Never Give Up Story (children's, with George Castle, illustrated by Rob Peters), Ascend Books 2017. .

See also
 Iowa Sports Hall of Fame
 List of National Football League head coaches with 50 wins
 List of professional gridiron football coaches with 200 wins

Notes

References

External links
 

1925 births
Living people
American football running backs
Buffalo Bills announcers
Buffalo Bills coaches
Buffalo Bills executives
Buffalo Bills head coaches
California Golden Bears football coaches
Coe Kohawks football coaches
Coe Kohawks football players
Coe Kohawks men's basketball coaches
Coe Kohawks men's basketball players
Kansas City Chiefs head coaches
Los Angeles Rams coaches
New Mexico Lobos football coaches
Philadelphia Eagles coaches
Players of American football from Chicago
Washington Redskins coaches
William & Mary Tribe football coaches
National Football League general managers
United States Football League announcers
United States Football League coaches
College men's track and field athletes in the United States
High school basketball coaches in Missouri
High school football coaches in Missouri
Pro Football Hall of Fame inductees
Harvard University alumni
United States Army Air Forces personnel of World War II
Sportspeople from Chicago
Jewish American sportspeople